Alice Bueñaflor Lake (November 23, 1924 – June 10, 2020), better known by her stage name Anita Linda, was a Filipino film actress. A romantic lead in her youth, she later gained critical acclaim for her portrayals in maternal or elderly roles. At the age of 74, she became the oldest actress to ever win a FAMAS Award, when she was named Best Supporting Actress for Ang Babae sa Bubungang Lata.

In 2008, at age 83, she was named Best Actress in the 10th Cinemanila International Film Festival (Southeast Asia Film Competition) for her portrayal of the title character in Adela.

Early career
Linda was born Alice Bueñaflor Lake in Pasay to James Lake, an American soldier and mining engineer, and Gorgonia Bueñaflor of Iloilo.

Linda was discovered by renowned director Lamberto Avellana while watching a stage show at the Avenue Theater starring Leopoldo Salcedo, Lopito, among others. Then a Ilongga teenager that couldn't speak Tagalog, she had second thoughts when she was asked backstage if she wanted to become an actress. Avellana then told her to report for rehearsals for the next show and later had her fetched when she didn't appear.

Linda first did High School with no dialogue, then Biyernes sa Quiapo with Jaime dela Rosa as her leading man, then Aksesorya with Leopoldo Salcedo onstage. Avellana later gave her the screen name Anita Linda and cast her in Tia Juana, her first film at LVN Pictures. The film was completed shortly before the Japanese invasion of the Philippines, but released only in 1943.

With the film studios being shut down for the duration of the war, Linda spent the war years performing on bodabil at Avenue Theater in Manila. After the war in 1947, she was later offered a contract by Premiere Productions where she was cast by Avellana in Sekretang Hong Kong with Pugo and Togo. Her first lead role in Alyas Sakim with Pol Salcedo in 1947 was directed by Moises Cagin.

In 1951, Linda portrayed the title character in Gerardo de Leon's Sisa, a film based on the tragic character in Jose Rizal's novel Noli Me Tangere. The role garnered her the Best Actress Maria Clara award (a precursor of the FAMAS). De Leon then cast Linda in Sawa sa Lumang Simboryo (1952), a role for which Linda would be nominated for a FAMAS Best Actress Award.

Later career
In the 1970s, Linda gained renewed critical acclaim in maternal roles she played for director Lino Brocka in Tinimbang Ka Ngunit Kulang (1974), Isa Dalawa Tatlo (1974) and Jaguar (1979). She would win the FAMAS Award for Best Supporting Actress for Isa Dalawa Tatlo. Linda would also be nominated for the Gawad Urian Best Supporting Actress Award for Jaguar, which was nominated for the Palme d'Or at the 1980 Cannes Film Festival. In 1982 she was given the Natatanging Gawad Urian ng Manunuri ng Pelikulang Pilipino.

Linda would appear in several leading films of the 1980s and 1990s, including Joey Gosiengfiao's Temptation Island (1980), Mike de Leon's Sister Stella L. (1984), Chito S. Roño's Itanong Mo sa Buwan and Brocka's Gumapang ka sa Lusak (1990). For her portrayal of an aging film actress in Mario O'Hara’s Ang Babae sa Bubungang Lata (1998), Linda would receive a Star Award for Best Supporting Actress and her second FAMAS Best Supporting Actress Award. For this, she set a record as the oldest actress to ever win a FAMAS at age 74. In 1987, Linda also won a Gawad Urian Best Supporting Actress award for Takaw Tukso.

Linda remained active in the film industry as she reached her eighties, appearing in such films as Aishite Imasu 1941: Mahal Kita (2004), You Are the One (2006) and Ouija (2007). In 2009, she returned to television, starring in the ABS-CBN drama Tayong Dalawa as Kim Chiu's ruthless Chinese grandmother Lily and in the upcoming ABS-CBN horror suspense primetime series Florinda.

Linda garnered widespread acclaim in 2008, she starred in the independent film, Adela (2008), directed by Adolfo Alix, Jr. For her performance playing the loneliness of a woman celebrating her 80th birthday alone when her children failed to visit her, she was cited as Best Actress in the 10th Cinemanila International Film Festival (Southeast Asia Film Competition), as Best Actress by the Young Critics Circle, and as Best Actress (tied with Judy Ann Santos) at the Gawad Tanglaw Awards. The New York Times film critic Stephen Holden praised Linda's performance as "quietly transfixing". In 2009, Anita Linda was given the ENPRESS Lino Brocka Lifetime Achievement Award.

She won the Best Supporting Actress award, for her performance in Sta. Niña, at the Cinemalaya 2012 under the New Breed Full Length Feature Category.

In 2014, she made a comeback on primetime television in an ensemble drama Sana Bukas pa ang Kahapon as Paulo Avelino's grandmother Lola Patchi.

Personal life
She was married to actor Fred Cortez Sr. The marriage lasted 2 years. They had a son Fred Cortez Jr.

In January 2009, Linda was unhurt in a mugging incident that occurred while she was aboard a taxicab. In October 1950, Linda's sister Mamey was murdered in a robbery attempt at the home they had shared; Linda herself was unharmed after she and her nieces had locked themselves in a bedroom to evade the burglars.

Death
Linda died on June 10, 2020. She was 95. The news was confirmed by her daughter, Francesca Legaspi by a text message to STAR news.

Filmography

Film

Television

Awards and nominations

International awards

Local awards

Notes

References

Bibliography

External links

1924 births
2020 deaths
20th-century Filipino actresses
21st-century Filipino actresses
Actresses from Metro Manila
Filipino film actresses
Filipino people of American descent
Filipino women comedians
People from Pasay